Victoria Park (Ward 12) is one of the 23 wards of Glasgow City Council. Created as Partick West in 2007 it returned four council members, using the single transferable vote system; the boundaries were unchanged in 2012. For the 2017 Glasgow City Council election, the boundaries were changed, the ward decreased in size and population, was re-named Victoria Park and returned three members.

Boundaries
Located in the west of Glasgow, the core of the ward since its creation as Partick West in 2007 has been formed from the Broomhill, Thornwood, Jordanhill, Glasgow Harbour and Whiteinch neighbourhoods, along with a small part of Anniesland (south of Anniesland Road and west of the Argyle Line railway), and a small part of Partick (west of the Argyle/North Clyde Line railway), with the southern boundary being the River Clyde.

The 2017 changes removed all territory to the east of the railway lines: most of Partick and Partickhill, and part of Anniesland south of Great Western Road, which were added to a new Partick East/Kelvindale ward. With little of Partick now in the boundaries, a new name was adopted from Victoria Park which had been in part of the territory since its creation.

The ethnic makeup of the  ward using the 2011 census population statistics was:

91.5% White Scottish / British / Irish / Other
6.3% Asian
1% Black (mainly African)
1.2% Mixed / Other Ethnic Group

Councillors

Election results

2022

2017

2012

2007

See also
Wards of Glasgow

References

External links
Listed Buildings in Victoria Park Ward, Glasgow City at British Listed Buildings

Wards of Glasgow
Partick